City Stadium Kičevo  is a multi-purpose stadium in Kičevo, North Macedonia.  It is used mostly for football matches and is the home stadium of FK Napredok. The stadium holds 5,000 people.

References

External links
Gradski Stadion Kičevo - Kičevo

Football venues in North Macedonia
Stadium
Stadium
Kičevo